The 2015 Open GDF Suez Seine-et-Marne was a professional tennis tournament played on indoor hard courts. It was the third edition of the tournament which was part of the 2015 ITF Women's Circuit, offering a total of $50,000 in prize money. It took place in Croissy-Beaubourg, France, on 30 March – 5 April 2015.

Women's singles entrants

Seeds 

 1 Rankings as of 23 March 2015

Other entrants 
The following players received wildcards into the singles main draw:
  Manon Arcangioli
  Myrtille Georges
  Mathilde Johansson
  Alizé Lim

The following players received entry from the qualifying draw:
  Ysaline Bonaventure
  Ivana Jorović
  Elitsa Kostova
  Marina Melnikova

Champions

Singles 

  Margarita Gasparyan def.  Mathilde Johansson, 6–3, 6–4

Doubles 

  Jocelyn Rae /  Anna Smith def.  Julie Coin /  Mathilde Johansson, 7–6(7–5), 7–6(7–2)

External links 
 2015 Open GDF Suez Seine-et-Marne at ITFtennis.com
 Official website 

2015 ITF Women's Circuit
2015 in French tennis
Open de Seine-et-Marne